Micromesistius, the blue whitings, is a genus of cods.

Species
The two currently recognized species in this genus are:
 Micromesistius australis Norman, 1937 (southern blue whiting)
 Micromesistius poutassou (A. Risso, 1827) (blue whiting)

References

Gadidae
Marine fish genera
Taxa named by Theodore Gill